"The Route of All Evil" is the twelfth episode of the third production season of the American animated television series Futurama, and the 44th episode of the series overall. It originally aired on the Fox network in the United States on December 8, 2002. In the episode, Dwight and Cubert form their own delivery company in an attempt to impress their fathers.

Plot 
Having been suspended from school for salting the bully Bret Blob (who appears to have the same weakness as slugs), Dwight and Cubert find themselves stuck with their fathers. After the boys send the Planet Express crew on a fake mission to deliver pizza to a nonexistent planet and generally annoy the staff, their fathers order them to get jobs. They decide to start up a company to rival Planet Express: a paper route. They become so successful that they take over Planet Express when it is discovered that the Professor was declared legally dead three years ago (he was really taking a nap in a ditch in the park). The name of the company is then changed to the name of the boys' delivery route, 'Awesome Express'. Humiliated, Hermes and the Professor leave Planet Express. Meanwhile, Fry, Leela and Bender brew beer inside Bender, then they treat Bender like an expectant mom.

Dwight and Cubert end up taking on too many customers and cannot deliver the papers. In a panic, they run to Hermes and the Professor to solve the problem.  All the papers are successfully delivered; however, as they pass Bret Blob's house the boys admit that they broke his window last week. Hermes and the Professor take the boys to apologize. When Mr. Blob does not accept the apology and insults them, the boys' fathers take offense and start a fight. Blob beats them up, but later apologizes in the hospital. Bender comes in with his beers to enjoy, and everything ends happily except for Cubert and Dwight who are swallowed by Bret Blob.

Cultural references
 While Bender, Leela and Fry are buying beer near the beginning of the episode, one brand is called Klein's and is in a Klein bottle. One other brand on the shelf is St. Pauli's Exclusion Principle. The brand "Pabst Blue Robot" is a parody on the brand Pabst Blue Ribbon.
 When Dwight and Cubert deliver the paper the first time round, they also deliver one to The Little Prince. He even yells "Au Revoir", after he is shot off his planet by Hermes in the end, referencing to the French origin of the novella.
When Dwight and Cubert are being chased by the dog over the asteroid, an Exogorth comes up from the hole in the asteroid and eats the dog. This is a parody of the Exogorth trying to eat the Millennium Falcon in The Empire Strikes Back.
 Bender's naming ideas for his beer, "Benderbrau" and "Botweiser" are both parodies on the popular alcoholic brands Baderbräu and Budweiser respectively.

Broadcast and reception
In its initial airing, the episode received a Nielsen rating of 2.6/4, placing it 97th among primetime shows for the week of December 2–8, 2002.

References

External links

The Route of All Evil at The Infosphere.

Futurama (season 3) episodes
2002 American television episodes